Sanjeet Desai (born 12 December 1997) is an Indian cricketer. He made his List A debut for Chhattisgarh in the 2017–18 Vijay Hazare Trophy on 12 February 2018. He made his first-class debut for Chhattisgarh in the 2018–19 Ranji Trophy on 1 November 2018. He made his Twenty20 debut on 5 November 2021, for Chhattisgarh in the 2021–22 Syed Mushtaq Ali Trophy.

References

External links
 

1997 births
Living people
Indian cricketers
Chhattisgarh cricketers
Place of birth missing (living people)